Butter Wood is a  biological Site of Special Scientific Interest (SSSI) east of Basingstoke in Hampshire. Part of Up Nately LNR, which is designated a  Local Nature Reserve, is in the SSSI.

This site is mainly deciduous woodland with a diverse geology and structure. Most of it is former wood pasture, with many glades and broad bridleways, and there are also several copses which were managed as coppice with standards. Fauna include a rich Lepidoptera, including 25 species of butterfly.

References

 
Sites of Special Scientific Interest in Hampshire